Metaphidippus mandibulatus is a species of spider in the family Salticidae (jumping spiders) from Costa Rica. It is the type species of Metaphidippus. The species name was first published in 1901 by Frederick Octavius Pickard-Cambridge.

References

Salticidae
Spiders of Central America
Endemic fauna of Costa Rica
Spiders described in 1901